Felix Joseph Aime Tetreault (b. July 10, 1892 – d. September 11, 1938) was a Canadian professional ice hockey player. In the National Hockey Association, he played with the Montreal Wanderers for one game in 1911–12 and in the 1916–17 season. He also played a two-game stint with the Toronto Shamrocks  in the 1914–15 season. He previously played with the Sydney Millionaires of the Maritime Professional Hockey League from 1912 to 1914.

References

1892 births
1938 deaths
Canadian ice hockey left wingers
Montreal Wanderers (NHA) players
Ice hockey people from Montreal
Toronto Shamrocks players